Dogsthorpe is a residential area and electoral ward of the city of Peterborough, in the Peterborough district, in the ceremonial county of Cambridgeshire, England. The population of the ward at the 2011 Census was 9,620.  Cambridgeshire Fire and Rescue Service maintain a fire station, crewed day and night and equipped with Water Tender, Rescue Vehicle and Aerial Platform, on Dogsthorpe Road.

Dogsthorpe County Infant and Junior and All Saints Church of England (Voluntary Aided) Junior schools are located in the area; following the closure of John Mansfield School in July 2007, secondary pupils attend the Thomas Deacon Academy which opened in September 2007. Marshfields, a special school for pupils aged 10–19 with moderate learning difficulties, is also located here.

Welland Estate
The adjacent Welland Estate was designed by Brian Ward in the 1960s and based on the Radburn design housing layout from the United States, which separates cars from housing so that the majority of houses are accessible from the front only by footpaths. A downside of this design is that it creates poor surveillance particularly for cars parked at the rear of the estate. However, a benefit is that it contains extensive green spaces, footpaths and alleyways linking streets in and around the estate.

See also
Dogsthorpe Star Pit
Deacon's School

References

External links

Suburbs of Peterborough
Radburn design housing estates